David Jagolinzer was an American litigation attorney best known for multi-million mass tort mesothelioma cases against major companies such as Honeywell International and Union Carbide.

Early life, education
David Jagolinzer was born and raised in Providence, Rhode Island. He graduated with a B.A. in English Literature and a minor in Italian Studies from Boston College in 1996. In 1999 he graduated with a J.D. from the University of Miami School of Law.

David peacefully passed away surrounded by his loving family on October 18, 2022.

Legal career
In 2005 Jagolinzer became a partner at the Ferraro Law Firm in Miami, and is currently a shareholder at the firm. He specializes in cases involving mesothelioma victims, product liability, toxic mass tort, and catastrophic personal injury and wrongful death.

Notable cases
In April 2008 he earned his client a $24.2 million jury verdict in Guilder v. Honeywell International, Inc.. At the time was the highest compensatory damage award against a single defendant in a Florida mesothelioma case in history. The case made The National Law Journal's Top 100 Verdicts for that year. However, this verdict was reversed on appeal.

Also in 2008, Jagolinzer was a key figure in convincing the court to declare the 2005 Florida Asbestos Statute as unconstitutional, in William v. American Optical Corporation. The now defunct law limited the amount and types of people allowed to sue for asbestos-related injuries.

Memberships
He is a member of the American Bar Association, Florida Bar Association, Massachusetts Bar Association, Dade County Professionalism Committee, American Association for Justice, and the National Italian American Bar Association.

References 

Living people
American people of Italian descent
University of Miami School of Law alumni
Morrissey College of Arts & Sciences alumni
Lawyers from Providence, Rhode Island
Year of birth missing (living people)